Daverdisse is a municipality of Wallonia located in the province of Luxembourg, Belgium.

On 1 January 2007, the municipality, which covers 56.4 km2, had 1,372 inhabitants, giving a population density of 24.3 inhabitants per km2.

The municipality consists of the following districts: Daverdisse, Gembes, Haut-Fays, and Porcheresse.

References

External links
 
Discover Daverdisse and the other villages of the municipality
Official site of the Municipality of Daverdisse

 
Municipalities of Luxembourg (Belgium)